Isaka Aongor Čerňák-Okanya (born 9 April 1989) is an Australian professional footballer who plays as an attacking midfielder for Olympic FC.

Club career

Youth career
In his youth football playing days, Cernak played for the Peninsula Power, Westside FC, Brisbane City, QAS and the AIS football teams.

Brisbane Roar
In 2008 Isaka Cernak joined A-League team Brisbane Roar (then called Queensland Roar), making 15 appearances and scoring a goal in his two seasons with the club. On 24 January 2009, Cernak made his senior debut as a substitute for Brisbane Roar against Perth Glory in a 4–2 win. In 2010, he left the Roar to join state rivals the North Queensland Fury.

North Queensland Fury
In June 2010, Isaka signed a deal with North Queensland Fury to become their 15th signed player for their upcoming season. He made 14 appearances for the Fury, scoring one goal in his season with the Fury. Unfortunately for Cernak, the Fury were unable to extend his contract due to FFA ownership of the club.

Melbourne Victory
During the 2010–11 season Melbourne Victory signed Cernak for the following season and Asian Champions League campaign as a replacement for departing striker Robbie Kruse to Bundesliga 2 club Fortuna Düsseldorf, with Fury unable to extend his contract due to FFA ownership of the club.

Wellington Phoenix
After being released by Melbourne during the January transfer window Cernak signed with Wellington Phoenix until the end of the season, having already agreeing to terms with Perth Glory for the following season.

Perth Glory
Just a few months after signing with Wellington Phoenix, Cernak signed with Perth Glory.

Central Coast Mariners
In February 2014 Isaka signed for reigning A-League champions Central Coast Mariners. Isaka stated upon signing: "Being able to have one-and-a-half years to learn as a footballer off 'Mossy' (Phil Moss) and the players at Central Coast Mariners is really exciting for me."

He was released from the Mariners in 2015 after the club opted against renewing his contract.

SuperSport United
He joined South African side SuperSport United in June 2015 on a 3-year deal. However, Isaka struggled to make an impact and made just 7 league appearances before he sustained a knee injury that required surgery, ruling him out for the rest of the season. He subsequently agreed to a contract termination.

Sisaket 
Isaka next joined Thai League club Sisaket where he made 14 appearances and scored 1 goal.

Home United
His signing for Singapore Premier League side Home United was announced on 13 July 2018, coming in to fill the vacant slot for foreign players left by Sirina Camara (whose season had been prematurely cut short by an ACL injury). He made his debut for the Protectors in a Singapore Cup loss against Tampines Rovers where he was introduced as a substitute. He followed up his debut by scoring his first goal for the club in the AFC Cup ASEAN Zone Finals a week later, scoring the goal that earned his team a 1–1 draw in the first-leg.

International career

Cernak has represented Australia at U-20 and U-23 level. He has 19 caps and five goals at U-20 level and he currently has 7 caps and zero goals at U-23 level. He has won the Weifang Cup U-18 competition for Australia in 2007 and the International Cor Groenewegen Tournament at U-20 level in 2009.

Personal life
Cernak was born in Galiwin'ku, Northern Territory. His father is Ugandan, and his mother is European Australian with a Scottish-Czech-American family background.

Career statistics

References

External links
 

1989 births
Living people
Australian people of Czech descent
Australian people of Ugandan descent
Australian people of Scottish descent
Australian people of American descent
Australia youth international soccer players
Australia under-20 international soccer players
A-League Men players
Brisbane Roar FC players
Northern Fury FC players
Melbourne Victory FC players
Central Coast Mariners FC players
Soccer players from Brisbane
Brisbane City FC players
Wellington Phoenix FC players
SuperSport United F.C. players
Isaka Cernak
Australian Institute of Sport soccer players
Association football midfielders
Australian soccer players